Blood on the Flat Track: The Rise of the Rat City Rollergirls is a documentary film produced and directed by Lainy Bagwell and Lacey Leavitt. The film documents the formative years of the Seattle women's flat track roller derby league, the Rat City Rollergirls.

Plot
With more than 30 leagues nationwide at the time forming the Women's Flat Track Derby Association, Blood on the Flat Track focuses on the Rat City Rollergirls of Seattle, who formed their league from scratch in April 2004. In the first season, the league started playing at a small rink in front of about 200 fans; they now sell out of stadiums monthly. This film follows the teams throughout its first two seasons and focuses on the women who comprise the league, their teams' struggle to win the championship bout and their relationships with each other.

Festival participation
 Seattle International Film Festival - World Premiere – June 14, 2007
 Calgary International Film Festival - September 2007
 Ellensburg Film Festival - October 2007
 Tallgrass Film Festival - October 2007
 Detroit Docs Film Festival - October 2007 - Founders Award Winner
 Seattle Lesbian and Gay Film Festival - October 2007 - Best Local Film – Jury Award Winner, Best Local Film – Audience Award Winner
 Olympia Film Festival - November 2007
 Northwest Film and Video Festival  - November 2007
 Mid-Valley Film and Video Festival - February 2008
 Aarhus Festival of Independent Art  - European Premiere - March 12, 2008
 Memphis International Film Festival - March 2008
 Canadian Sports Film Festival - May 2008 – Opening Night Gala Film
 Michigan Womyn's Music Festival - August 2008
 Mardi Gras Film Festival  - Sydney, Australia - February 2009
 Brisbane Queer Film Festival - April 2009

DVD availability
Blood on the Flat Track was released on DVD in Canada on October 6, 2009, by Mongrel Media and was released in the United States by Strand Releasing on February 23, 2010.

External links
 
 

2007 films
2007 documentary films
American sports documentary films
Documentary films about Seattle
Roller derby films
Documentary films about women's sports
2007 directorial debut films
Women's sports in Washington (state)
Roller derby in the United States
Sports in Seattle
Films shot in Seattle
Films set in Seattle
2000s English-language films
2000s American films